Mount de Sales Academy (MDS) is a Catholic, independent, college preparatory school in Macon, Georgia. It was originally founded in 1876 by five Sisters of Mercy, an order of nuns, as a boarding school for girls. It is the oldest independent school in Middle Georgia and the first to racially integrate. The school is located within the Roman Catholic Diocese of Savannah, operating on an independent basis.

History

Early history 
In 1871 during the post-Civil War Reconstruction era, a group of five Sisters of Mercy from Columbus, Georgia, began a small school known as the Academy of the Sacred Heart Jesus on the corner of 4th and Walnut streets in Macon.  In 1876, the mother house of the Sisters relocated from Columbus to Macon. With help from others, the Sisters purchased the former home of Georgia Governor George W. Town for use at the corner of Orange and Columbus streets on Beall's Hill in downtown Macon. On February 28, 1876, the new school was chartered under the name of Mount de Sales in honor of Saint Francis de Sales. When the first graduation exercises were held in 1882, it had expanded to comprise three divisions: primary, preparatory and senior. It educated mostly girls in grades 1-12, housing boarding students from around the southeastern United States and Latin America.

Modernization and expansion

In 1936, Mount de Sales discontinued its primary school. But it continued as a girl's secondary school for boarding and day students until 1959, when the first boys were admitted as day students. The girl's boarding school closed in 1963 and the school continued as a coeducation day school. The first coeducational graduating class included 16 boys among 46 total graduates in 1963. The fall of 1963 marked the racial integration of Mount de Sales as a result of a diocesan edict, making it the first school in Middle Georgia to desegregate. A year later, it graduated its first two black students: Eileen Williams and Cheryl Odom.

In 1975, the middle school returned with the re-addition of an eighth grade. A seventh grade was reinstalled in 1988, followed by a sixth grade in 2004. The Sisters of Mercy served in an administrative capacity until 2002, when the first lay head of school was appointed by the Board of Trustees, the school's governing body. Mount de Sales continues to be sponsored by the Sisters of Mercy.

The original convent and boarding school building was demolished in the early 1970s and replaced with Sheridan Hall in 1990. New buildings were constructed over the following decades. In 2015, the school underwent $1 million of enhancements to align with redevelopment changes in Macon's College Hill Corridor, a two-square mile area between Mercer University and the downtown business district.

Academics
The upper school's curriculum includes honor, Advanced Placement (AP) and dual-enrollment college courses in most subject areas, along with a broad range of elective courses. Upper school students must perform 20 hours of community service annually, while middle school students are required to complete service projects.  The middle school's House System places students in cross-grade level groups to foster positive social development. All students take theology courses and attend Mass on Holy Days. While Mount de Sales has a Catholic heritage, about two-thirds of students are of non-Catholic faiths. Students hail from more than 30 Georgia zip codes and the school hosts dozens of international exchange students.

Controversy
In 2014, the school's administrators fired Flint Dollar, an openly gay music teacher who planned to marry his longtime male partner, based on the Catholic church's doctrine against same-sex marriage. Opposition to the firing came from students and parents. In 2015, both parties reached a confidential legal settlement.

Athletics
Mount de Sales competes in a number of interscholastic athletics in Class A of the Georgia High School Association (GHSA), where it previously was a member from 1961 to 1980. Prior to the 2014-15 school year, it competed for 33 years in the Georgia Independent School Association (GISA).

The Cavaliers, as the school's teams are nicknamed, compete at the varsity, junior varsity and C-team levels. The school also sponsors cheerleading and a band. Cavalier Fields is home to Mount de Sale's football stadium, soccer fields, a track, baseball and softball fields, tennis courts and practice fields. Most indoor athletics are held at McAuley Hall, the downtown campus gymnasium. The Cavalier Sports Hall of Fame honors athletes, coaches, administrators and supporters who have made significant contributions to the athletic program.

Fall sports 
 Cross country
 Football
 Softball
 Volleyball

Winter sports 
 Basketball
 Swimming 
 Wrestling

Spring sports 
 Baseball
 Golf
 Lacrosse
 Soccer
 Tennis
 Track and field

Accreditation and membership

 Southern Association of Independent Schools
 National Association of Independent Schools
 Georgia Independent School Association
 Georgia High School Association
 National Middle School Association
 Georgia Middle School Association
 National Catholic Education Association
 Mercy Secondary Education Association
 National Association for College Admission Counseling
 Cognia
 National Blue Ribbon School of Excellence (1990–91)

Notable alumni

 Tina McElroy Ansa, novelist
 Bill Berry, drummer for the band R.E.M.
 Douglas M. Brooks, former director of the White House Office of National AIDS Policy
 Mary G. Bryan, former president of the Society of American Archivists
 Betty Cantrell, 2016 Miss America, 2015 Miss Georgia
Gwendolyne Cowart, WASP pilot in World War II
 Natalia Livingston, actress
 Cole Miller, Ultimate Fighting Championship featherweight MMA fighter
 Arnold L. Punaro, former U.S. Marine Corps major general
 Lisa Sheridan, actress

References

External links
 
 Roman Catholic Diocese of Savannah

Preparatory schools in Georgia (U.S. state)
Schools in Macon, Georgia
Catholic secondary schools in Georgia (U.S. state)
Sisters of Mercy schools
Private high schools in Georgia (U.S. state)
Private middle schools in Georgia (U.S. state)
Educational institutions established in 1876
1876 establishments in Georgia (U.S. state)